A. flava may refer to:
 Aesculus flava, the yellow buckeye, common buckeye or sweet buckeye, a tree species native to the Ohio Valley and Appalachian Mountains of the Eastern United States
 Anomis flava, the cotton looper, tropical anomis or white-pupiled scallop moth, a moth species
 Antarcticimonas flava, a bacterium from the genus of Antarcticimonas
 Arenivirga flava, a bacterium from the genus of Arenivirga

See also 
 Flava (disambiguation)